Syrrusoides is a genus of moths of the family Noctuidae in Madagascar.

Species
 Syrrusoides lecordieri Laporte, 1972
 Syrrusoides viettei Laporte, 1972

References

Natural History Museum Lepidoptera genus database
Syrrusoides at funet

Hadeninae